The Estadio Juan Domingo Perón, popularly known as El Cilindro de Avellaneda, is an association football stadium located in the Avellaneda district of Greater Buenos Aires, Argentina. The stadium is the home venue of Racing Club.

The stadium was designed by German engineers, some of them with experience in the reconstruction of cities destroyed in the World War II. It has a capacity of 61,000 spectators, being the second largest stadium of Argentina, after Estadio Monumental.

Racing venue was the first stadium to have roof grandstands, after refurbishment made in the 1990s.

The "Presidente Perón" replaced Estadio Alsina y Colón, which was closed in 1947.

History 
The first project to build this stadium started in 1944, with the purpose of improving club's facilities. A special committee was created to acquire 30,000 m² that were owned by railway companies (British-owned by then). It is clear that President of Argentina, Juan Domingo Perón (well-known Racing Club supporter) suggested to build the stadium in Retiro neighborhood, near de Buenos Aires downtown. Nevertheless, the club executives decided to stay in Avellaneda to keep their place of belonging.

Works began in 1946. The National Government lent Racing Club the money to finance the construction. As gratitude for that, the club executives named Juan Perón honorary president of Racing and his wife Eva Perón honorary member, among some ministers of his cabinet. President of Racing Club, Carlos Pailot, stated that the stadium would be named "Presidente Juan D. Perón" in his honor.

On 1 December 1946, Racing played its last match in the old stadium, vs Rosario Central (a 4–6 defeat). The old stadium was demolished while the new venue was inaugurated on 3 September 1950, when Racing beat Vélez Sársfield 1–0. Llamil Simes scored the only goal.

In 1951 the Presidente Perón stadium was one of the venues for the Pan American Games held in Argentina that year. All the football matches of the competition were held there. In 1966, the club placed light towers. To celebrate that, the club invited FC Bayern Munich (that brought Argentina some of its most notable players such as Franz Beckenbauer, Gerd Muller and Sepp Maier) to play a match in the stadium, which was won by Racing 3–2.

At international club level, Racing Club played significant matches in Estadio Presidente Perón, such as the 1967 Copa Libertadores final v Club Nacional de Football and the 1967 Intercontinental Cup final v European champion Celtic FC. At domestic competitions level, Racing was the venue for the 1969 Argentine Primera División final between Chacarita Juniors and River Plate, and the 1976 final where Boca Juniors beat River Plate 1–0 with the "ghost goal" by Rubén Suñé.

In 1993, the Municipality of Avellaneda gave its approval to change the name of Cuyo, one of the streets that surround the stadium. The name changed to Oreste Corbatta to honour a player who is regarded as the greatest idol in the history of Racing.It also resembles an American cookie cutter stadium from the 60s and 70s

Concerts
The stadium has hosted some national and international concerts since the late 1990s. Some of the artists to have played at the stadium are Redonditos de Ricota (1998, with an attendance of 35,000), Rammstein (on 27 November 2010),  Judas Priest and Whitesnake together (18 Sep 2011), and local rock band Viejas Locas (14 Jul 2012).

See also 
 Estadio Racing Club (former Racing venue)

References

External links

 

Racing Club de Avellaneda
Football venues in Argentina
Sports venues in Buenos Aires Province
1950 establishments in Argentina